Thatayaone Kgamanyane (born 30 January 1996) is a Botswana football midfielder.

Honours

Club
 Gaborone United
FA Cup:1
2020

Individual
Botswana Premier League Golden Boot: 2018
Orange FA Cup Player of the Tournament: 2020

References

1996 births
Living people
Botswana footballers
Botswana international footballers
Gaborone United S.C. players
Chippa United F.C. players
Association football midfielders
Botswana expatriate footballers
Expatriate soccer players in South Africa
Botswana expatriate sportspeople in South Africa
South African Premier Division players